Thrombogenicity refers to the tendency of a material in contact with the blood to produce a thrombus, or clot.  It not only refers to fixed thrombi but also to emboli, thrombi which have become detached and travel through the bloodstream.  Thrombogenicity can also encompass events such as the activation of immune pathways and the complement system.  All materials are considered to be thrombogenic with the exception of the normal state of endothelial cells which line blood vessels.  Certain medical implants appear non-thrombogenic due to high flow rates of blood past the implant, but in reality all are thrombogenic to a degree. Various surface treatments are available to minimize these thrombogenic effects.

A thrombogenic implant will eventually be covered by a fibrous capsule, the thickness of this capsule can be considered one measure of thrombogenicity, and if extreme can lead to the failure of the implant.

See also
 Endothelial activation

References

Further reading
 
 

Blood
Hematology